Las Lomas (also known as Carmelitas) is a neighbourhood (barrio) of Asunción, Paraguay.

Neighbourhoods of Asunción